Holly Thompson Rehder is an American politician. A Republican, she was a member of the Missouri House of Representatives from 2013 to 2020, elected from the from the 148th district (parts of Scott and Mississippi counties).  She had been a member of the Missouri Senate from the 27th district since January 2021, having been elected to that body in the November 2020 election.

Business career and education
Rehder received her GED, then attended the Southeast Missouri State University. She did not initially complete her degree, dropping out to work full-time instead. After 17 years, she received a Bachelor's in mass communication and a double minor in Political Science and Communications for Legal Professionals (debate).

Rehder and her former husband, Ray, founded Integrity Communications, a cable telecommunications installation and construction contractor, in 2004.

Political career
Rehder spent eight years in the Missouri House of Representatives holding the seat for the 148th District. In the state House, Rehder sponsored a right-to-work law, which was opposed by organized labor. She also sponsored legislation to legalize needle-exchange programs as a way to prevent the spread of hepatitis C and HIV and to encourage intravenous drug users to seek treatment.

Since taking office in 2013, Rehder campaigned for legislation to establish a state database to track prescriptions for addictive drugs such as opioids.  The proposal was endorsed by Governor Mike Parson, but faced resistance from some legislators who cited privacy concerns, and failed to advance in several legislative sessions. In supporting the proposal, Rehder cited the experience of her daughter, who had become addicted to painkillers at age 17 after receiving a prescription following a finger injury. Missouri was the only state without such a monitoring database until Rehder's bill passed in 2021.

Due to Missouri's term limits law, she was ineligible to run for another state House term in 2020, so instead she ran for the Missouri Senate, District 27 to replace state Senator Wayne Wallingford. She won the Republican primary election in August 2020 by a narrow margin of 141 votes, defeating Kathryn Swan; Rehder received 16,839 votes (50.2%) to Swan's 16,698 votes (49.8%). She was easily elected in the heavily Republican district in the 2020 general election, receiving with 63,644 votes (76.9%), defeating Democratic nominee Donnie Owens, who earned 19,135 votes (23.1%). The 27th Senate district covers a geographically large region in southeast Missouri, specifically the counties of Bollinger, Cape Girardeau, Madison, Perry, Scott, and Wayne.

Rehder praised Donald Trump and in 2019 pledged to promote "the Trump Agenda" in Southeast Missouri. She supports anti-abortion laws. In 2021, Rehder sponsored a measure to declare January 12 "Rush Limbaugh Day" in Missouri to commemorate recently deceased conservative talk radio host and provocateur.

Amid the COVID-19 pandemic in Missouri, Rehder was one of five Republican state senators who called on Governor Parson to call a special session to pass legislation to ban employer mandates for employees to be vaccinated against COVID-19, including mandates by both public entities and private businesses.

Electoral history

Personal life
Rehder was married to Raymond Rehder; they divorced after 27 years of marriage.

References

External links

1969 births
21st-century American politicians
21st-century American women politicians
Living people
Republican Party members of the Missouri House of Representatives
Republican Party Missouri state senators
Women state legislators in Missouri